The Price of Silence may refer to:

The Price of Silence (EP), a 2008 EP and song by various artists
The Price of Silence (1916 film), an American silent film starring Lon Chaney
The Price of Silence (1917 film), an American silent drama film
The Price of Silence (1959 film), a British crime film
The Price of Silence (book), a 2014 nonfiction book about the Duke lacrosse case